The Phillip Island Trophy was a new addition to the WTA Tour in 2021.

Ankita Raina and Kamilla Rakhimova won the title, defeating Anna Blinkova and Anastasia Potapova in the final, 2–6, 6–4, [10–7].

Seeds

Draw

Finals

Top half

Bottom half

References
Main Draw

Phillip Island Trophy - Doubles
Phillip Island Trophy